Two rail accidents have occurred near Castlecary, Scotland. One of these was in 1937 and one in 1968. Both events involved  rear-end collisions, and caused the deaths of 35 and 2 people respectively.

1937 accident 

On 10 December 1937 at 4:37 pm, the 4:03 pm Edinburgh Waverley to Glasgow Queen Street express train collided at Castlecary station with the late-running 2:00 pm express train from Dundee to Glasgow Queen Street on the Edinburgh to Glasgow main line of the London and North Eastern Railway (LNER), killing 35 people. At the time of the accident, whiteout conditions prevailed due to a snowstorm.

The Edinburgh train hit the rear of the standing Dundee train at an estimated . Due to the confines of the location, the rear four coaches of the Dundee train disintegrated completely. The engine of the Dundee train, an LNER Class D29 no. 9896 Dandie Dinmont, was pushed forward  with the brakes on. The locomotive of the Edinburgh train, LNER Class A3 no. 2744 Grand Parade, was damaged beyond repair (and was replaced by a new engine with the same number and name in April 1938).

Aftermath 
The death toll was 35 (including 7 train crew) and 179 people were hurt, most of them seriously. The Scotsman published a detailed list of all the killed and injured. An eight-year-old girl was counted as missing (some locals swore to seeing her ghost for many years). The driver of the Edinburgh train was committed to court on a charge of culpable homicide (the Scottish equivalent of manslaughter) for supposedly driving too fast for the weather conditions, but the charge was dropped. The Inspecting Officer concluded that it was the signalman who was principally at fault for the disaster. This was Britain's worst snow-related rail crash, others of note being Elliot Junction in 1906 and Abbots Ripton in 1876. A full length part animated, part documentary film about the incident and its effects was made in 2020.

Causes 
The whiteout meant that visibility was no more than a few yards and so the signalmen on this stretch of line were operating Regulation 5e. This meant that a double section had to be clear ahead for a train to be signalled to pass the previous box, Greenhill Junction. A set of points ahead had been blocked by snow and caused several trains to back up and the Castlecary home signal was therefore at 'danger'. The Dundee train ran past that signal in poor visibility but managed to stop just beyond it. The Castlecary signalman failed to check the train’s whereabouts and allowed the following Edinburgh train into the section. This also ran past the same signal and collided with the Dundee train. It is believed that the Castlecary distant signal had stuck in the 'off' ('clear') position and so the drivers of both trains took it that the line was clear. The driver of the Edinburgh train only realised that it was not when he crossed the viaduct and saw that the home signal was at 'danger'. Even a modern road vehicle would not have stopped in the remaining  to the tail lamp (which was flattened).

1968 accident 

A second accident occurred in Castlecary on 9 September 1968, also a rear-end collision. Following the failure of a signal at Greenhill Junction, trains were required (by Rule 55) to stop at the failed signal and report their presence to Signalman D. Craig at Greenhill Junction via the signal telephone. This method had worked since the signal's failure the night before and throughout the early morning, but at 09:00, Craig became confused by the presence of four different trains in the Greenhill area.

Of these trains, the Down 07:40 Dundee-Glasgow service passed through Greenhill uneventfully, but its passage resulted in Craig being forced to hold the Down 08:30 Edinburgh-Glasgow service north of Greenhill Junction. At the same time, the Up 08:46 Glasgow-Edinburgh service driven by Driver W. Watson, consisting of two six-car Class 126 DMUs, stopped at the failed signal, and when Watson contacted Craig on the telephone, Craig misunderstood the call, believing Watson to be the Down train, and told him that he was waiting for a train at Greenhill Junction. The mistake was furthered by Watson's failure to identify his train. Shortly after, Class 24 engine D5122, crewed by Driver W. McIntosh and Secondman R. Birrell, running light from Glasgow to Perth, arrived at the signal in rear of the Up train. Birrell contacted Craig at Greenhill. Like Watson, Birrell failed to identify his train; in combination with Birrell’s impatient tone, this led Craig to repeat the mistake - again believing that he was speaking to the Up DMU at the failed signal. (Its Rule 55 call had been overdue for some minutes.) He gave Birrell authority to pass the signal ahead at danger, at caution speed. As result, when the Up DMU became visible to him, he was unable to stop in time and collided with the rear of the Up DMU. Both trainmen were killed instantly. Mere seconds after the collision, the Down line cleared and the Down DMU proceeded, suffering minor damage from a jutting piece of debris scraping the cab.

The report by Colonel I.K.A. McNaughton in 1970 agreed that the accident was due to a combination of Craig's confusion in identifying the trains, furthered by Birrell and Watson's failure to identify their trains, and that Driver McIntosh had driven his train at an unsafe speed past the signal.

See also
 Lists of rail accidents
 List of British rail accidents

References

Sources

External links
 
 The official report of the 1937 crash
 The account and official report of the 1968 crash in the Railways Archive
 British Pathe newsreel of crash

Train collisions in Scotland
Railway accidents in 1937
Railway accidents in 1968
1937 disasters in the United Kingdom
1937 in Scotland
1968 in Scotland
History of North Lanarkshire
History of Falkirk (council area)
Transport in North Lanarkshire
Transport in Falkirk (council area)
Accidents and incidents involving London and North Eastern Railway
Accidents and incidents involving British Rail
Lists of railway accidents and incidents in Scotland
Railway accidents caused by signaller's error
1968 disasters in the United Kingdom